Jérémy Clément (born 26 August 1984) is a French professional football manager and former player. Playing as a midfielder, he spent most of his career with two clubs, Paris Saint-Germain and Saint-Étienne.

Playing career
Though born in Béziers, Clément was raised in Rives, Isère, and started his career at Rives SF.

Clément, who was formed by Ligue 1 club Olympique Lyonnais, joined Rangers on 7 July 2006 on a three-year contract after a £1.1 million deal was agreed between the two clubs. In joining Rangers, Clément linked up with his former Lyon manager Paul Le Guen and former assistant manager Yves Colleu. Both departed the club in January 2007.

Paul Le Guen's new club Paris Saint-Germain entered the race to sign him as did Lyon, the club Rangers had purchased Clément from in the summer. On 25 January 2007, the Rangers official website confirmed Clément had re-joined Le Guen at PSG, turning down Lyon in the process. The fee was believed to be around £1.8 million.

In July 2011, Clément signed for AS Saint-Étienne.

In June 2019, after two seasons with AS Nancy, he agreed a move to fifth-tier side Bourgoin-Jallieu.

In April 2020, after his club's season had been ended prematurely due to the COVID-19 pandemic, Clement announced his retirement from playing.

Managerial career 
Ahead of the 2020–21 season, Clément was appointed as joint-manager of Bourgoin-Jallieu alongside Laurent Rugelj. He became the club's sole head coach after the departure of Rugelj in December 2020. After two years at the club, the parties decided by mutual agreement, not to extend the contract, why Clément left the position at the end of the 2021-22 season.

Personal life
Clément was tested for Swine flu H1N1 virus in October 2009 along with two PSG teammates, Ludovic Giuly and Mamadou Sakho. This led to the league postponing Marseille's match with Paris Saint-Germain.

Honours
Lyon
 Ligue 1: 2004–05, 2005–06
 Trophée des Champions: 2005

Paris Saint-Germain
 Coupe de France: 2009–10
 Coupe de la Ligue: 2007–08

References

External links
 
 
 

1984 births
Living people
Sportspeople from Béziers
French footballers
Footballers from Occitania (administrative region)
Association football midfielders
France under-21 international footballers
Olympique Lyonnais players
Rangers F.C. players
Paris Saint-Germain F.C. players
AS Saint-Étienne players
AS Nancy Lorraine players
FC Bourgoin-Jallieu players
Ligue 1 players
Ligue 2 players
Scottish Premier League players
French football managers
FC Bourgoin-Jallieu managers
French expatriate footballers
French expatriate sportspeople in Scotland
Expatriate footballers in Scotland